Ek Nari Do Roop is a 1973 Bollywood crime drama film directed by Madhusudan. The film stars Roopesh Kumar, Nadira and Shatrughan Sinha. The movie has two famous songs; "Tum Samjho To Achha Hai" sung by Kishore Kumar & Asha Bhosle and "Dil Ka Soona Saaz Tarana Dhundega", sung by Mohammed Rafi. The movie is loosely based on the 1959 novel Shock Treatment by James Hadley Chase.

Cast
Shatrughan Sinha as Vishal
Rashmi Dhawan as Lalita
Asha Sachdev as Sujata
Madan Puri as Belani
Iftekhar as Dinesh 
Malika as Sameena
Roopesh Kumar as Ali Ahmed "Pocketmaar"
Mehmood Junior as Ramu
Chaman Puri as Petrol Pump Owner

Songs

References

External links
 

1973 films
1970s Hindi-language films
1973 drama films
Indian crime drama films